The State Bank of Pakistan (SBP) is the Central Bank of Pakistan. Its Constitution, as originally laid down in the State Bank of Pakistan Order 1948, remained basically unchanged until 1 January 1974, when the bank was Nationalized and the scope of its functions was considerably enlarged. The State Bank of Pakistan Act 1956, with subsequent amendments, forms the basis of its operations today. The headquarters are located in the financial capital of the country in Karachi. The bank has a fully owned subsidiary with the name SBP Banking Services Corporation (SBP-BSC), the operational arm of the Central Bank with Branch Office in 16 cities across Pakistan, including the capital Islamabad and the four Provincial Capitals Lahore, Karachi, Peshawar, Quetta. The State Bank of Pakistan has other fully owned subsidiaries as well: National Institute of Banking and Finance, the training arm of the bank providing training to Commercial Banks, the Deposit Protection Corporation, and ownership of the Pakistan Security Printing Corporation.

History 

Before independence on 14 August 1947, during the British colonial era, the Reserve Bank of India was the central bank for the then undivided subcontinent. On the 30th of December 1948 the British Government's commission distributed the Reserve Bank of India's reserves between Pakistan and India—30 percent (750 M gold) for Pakistan and 70 percent for India.

The losses incurred in the transition to independence, the small amount taken from Pakistan's share (a total of 230 million). In May 1948 Muhammad Ali Jinnah (Founder of Pakistan) took steps to establish the State Bank of Pakistan immediately. These were implemented in June 1948, and the State Bank of Pakistan commenced operation on July 1, 1948.

Under the State Bank of Pakistan Order 1948, the state bank of Pakistan was charged with the duty to "regulate the issue of bank notes and keeping of reserves with a view to securing monetary stability in Pakistan and generally to operate the currency and credit system of the country to its advantage".

Initially, a large percent of the state bank was funded by industrial families, who Quaid-e-Azam promoted. They would allot a percentage of their annual profit towards the functioning of the bank. Most notably, the Valika Family would allocate the largest share amongst these families, who also possessed good ties with the Quaid, since September 1947 when the Quaid laid the foundations of the first textile mill of Pakistan, Valika Textile Mills.

A large section of the state bank's duties was widened when the State Bank of Pakistan Act 1956 was introduced. It required the state bank to "regulate the monetary and credit system of Pakistan and to foster its growth in the best national interest with a view to securing monetary stability and fuller utilization of the country’s productive resources". In February 1994, the State Bank was given full autonomy, during the financial sector reforms.

On January 21, 1997, this autonomy was further strengthened when the government issued three Amendment Ordinances (which were approved by the Parliament in May 1997). Those included were the State Bank of Pakistan Act, 1956, Banking Companies Ordinance, 1962 and Banks Nationalization Act, 1974. These changes gave full and exclusive authority to the State Bank to regulate the banking sector, to conduct an independent monetary policy and to set a limit on government borrowings from the State Bank of Pakistan. The amendments to the Banks Nationalization Act brought the end of the Pakistan Banking Council (an institution established to look after the affairs of NCBs) and allowed the jobs of the council to be appointed to the Chief Executives, Boards of the Nationalized Commercial Banks (NCBs) and Development Finance Institutions (DFIs). The State Bank having a role in their appointment and removal. The amendments also increased the autonomy and accountability of the chief executives, the Boards of Directors of banks and DFIs.

The State Bank of Pakistan also performs both the traditional and developmental functions to achieve macroeconomic goals. The traditional functions may be classified into two groups:
1) The primary functions including an issue of notes, regulation and supervision of the financial system, bankers’ bank, lender of the last resort, banker to Government, and conduct of monetary policy.
2) The secondary functions including the agency function like management of public debt, management of foreign exchange, etc., and other functions like advising the government on policy matters and maintaining close relationships with international financial institutions.

The non-traditional or promotional functions, performed by the State Bank include the development of a financial framework, institutionalization of savings and investment, provision of training facilities to bankers, and provision of credit to priority sectors. The State Bank also has been playing an active part in the process of Islamization of the banking system.

The Bank is active in promoting financial inclusion policy and is a leading member of the Alliance for Financial Inclusion. It is also one of the original 17 regulatory institutions to make specific national commitments to financial inclusion under the Maya Declaration during the 2011 Global Policy Forum held in Mexico.  In 2019, the SBP launched the National Payment Systems Strategy to lay out a framework for Pakistan to foster a modern digital payments infrastructure.

Regulation of liquidity 

The State Bank of Pakistan has also been entrusted with the responsibility to carry out monetary and credit policy in accordance with Government targets for growth and inflation with the recommendations of the Monetary and Fiscal Policies Co-ordination Board without trying to effect the macroeconomic policy objectives.

The state bank also regulates the volume and the direction of flow of credit to different uses and sectors, the state bank makes use of both direct and indirect instruments of monetary management. During the 1980s, Pakistan embarked upon a program of financial sector reforms, which lead to a number of fundamental changes. Due to these changes the conduct of monetary management which brought about changes to the administrative controls and quantitative restrictions to market based monetary management. A reserve money management programme has been developed, for intermediate target of M2, that would be achieved by observing the desired path of reserve money – the operating target.

State Bank of Pakistan has changed the format and designs of many bank notes which are currently in circulation in Pakistan. These steps were taken to overcome the problems of fraudulent activities.

Banking 

The State Bank of Pakistan looks into many ranges of banking to deal with changes in the economic climate and different purchasing and buying powers. Here are some of the banking areas that the bank looks into:

 State Bank's Shariah Board approves essentials and model agreements for Islamic modes of financing
 Procedure for submitting claims with SBP in respect of unclaimed deposits surrendered by banks/DFIs
 Banking sector supervision in Pakistan
 Microfinance
 Small and medium enterprises (SMEs)
 Minimum capital requirements for Banks
 Remittance facilities in Pakistan
 Opening of foreign currency accounts with banks in Pakistan under new scheme
 Handbook of corporate governance
 Guidelines on risk management
 Guidelines on commercial paper
 Guidelines on securitization
 SBP Scheme for agricultural financing

Bank assets and liabilities 
This is a chart of trend of major assets and liabilities reported by scheduled commercial banks to the State Bank of Pakistan with figures in millions of Pakistani rupees.

 Legal services
 Library
 Payment systems
 Real time gross settlement system (RTGS system)
 Small and medium enterprises
 Training and Development Department (TDD)
 Treasury operations
 Strategic and corporate planning
 Microfinance
 Pakistan remittance initiative
 Remittances
 Information Systems and Technology Department
 Risk Management Department

Currency Management Strategy 
Commercial banks are allowed by State Bank of Pakistan (SBP) to outsource their cash processing functions that includes sorting, authentication and packing of banknotes to cash processing companies.

Governor 

The principal officer of the SBP is the Governor.

Board of Directors 
The Board (previously known as the Central Board) consists of ten members: the Governor (who is Chairman), the Secretary, Finance Division, Government of Pakistan – and eight Directors, including one Director from each Province, to be nominated by the Federal Government. The Directors (and the Governor) are appointed for a term of three years. Traditionally, these directors (other than Secretary, Finance Division) are re-appointed for a second term, though this is not a requirement of the law, and there have been a few exceptions to this practice.

The current Board of Directors consists of the following (there being two vacancies):

 Murtaza Syed (Acting Governor SBP)
 Arif Ahmed Khan (Secretary Finance)
 Tariq Hassan
 Hafiz Mohammad Yousaf
 Zubyr Soomro
 Khawaja Iqbal Hassan
 Ardeshir Khursheed Marker
 Bairum Khan
 Sarmad Amin
 Laiba Sengsy

Museum

See also 

 Governor of State Bank of Pakistan
 National Bank of Pakistan
 EXIM Bank of Pakistan
 Zarai Taraqiati Bank Limited
 Pakistani Rupee
 Banking in Pakistan
 Raast
 1LINK

References

External links 
 State Bank of Pakistan

 
Pakistan
Financial regulation in Pakistan
Financial regulatory authorities of Pakistan
Pakistani companies established in 1948
Banks established in 1948
Pakistan federal departments and agencies
Government agencies established in 1948
Companies based in Karachi
Banking in Pakistan